Linexert is a commune in the Haute-Saône department in France's Bourgogne-Franche-Comté region.

See also
Communes of the Haute-Saône department

References

Communes of Haute-Saône